Indecision Records is an independent American hardcore punk record label, which was started by punk photographer and fanzine editor Dave Mandel in 1992 as an offshoot of his fanzine, Indecision. It is based in Garden Grove, California, and until about 2001 it was based in nearby Huntington Beach.

See also 
 List of record labels

External links
 Official site
 Interview with Dave Mandel

Record labels established in 1995
American independent record labels
Punk record labels
Hardcore record labels
Alternative rock record labels